{{DISPLAYTITLE:C12H15NO2}}
The molecular formula C12H15NO2 (molar mass: 205.2535 g/mol, exact mass: 205.1103 u) may refer to:

 2C-YN
 MDMAT (6,7-methylenedioxy-N-methyl-2-aminotetralin)

Molecular formulas